Efrain Gusquiza (born 13 March 1945) is a Peruvian weightlifter. He competed in the men's middle heavyweight event at the 1968 Summer Olympics.

References

External links
 

1945 births
Living people
Peruvian male weightlifters
Olympic weightlifters of Peru
Weightlifters at the 1968 Summer Olympics
Sportspeople from Lima
20th-century Peruvian people
21st-century Peruvian people